The Lotilla River is a river in South Sudan.  It rises in marshes on the borders of the erstwhile Eastern Equatoria and Jonglei states and flows north to join the Pibor River near Pibor, at a junction with the Kangen River. The marshes are fed by the Medikiret River, which has its origins in marshes further south.

See also
 List of rivers of South Sudan

References

External links
Lotilla River
sudan-map
Map of Eastern Equatoria

Rivers of South Sudan
Jonglei State
Geography of Eastern Equatoria
Greater Upper Nile